The 2020 FIVB Beach Volleyball World Tour is the global elite professional beach volleyball circuit organized by the Fédération Internationale de Volleyball (FIVB) for the 2019–20 beach volleyball season. Starts in late early October 2019, the 2020 FIVB Beach Volleyball World Tour Calendar comprised by two FIVB World Tour 4-star tournaments, one 3-star, two 2-star and eleven 1-star event, all organised by the FIVB. Several events were postponed or canceled due to COVID-19 pandemic.

Schedule
Key

Men

Women

Medal table by country

References

External links
2020 FIVB Beach Volleyball World Tour at FIVB.org
Swatch Major Series official website

 

World Tour
2020
FIVB Beach